Conospermum acerosum, commonly known as needle-leaved smokebush, is a shrub endemic to Western Australia

Description

Taxonomy
It was first published in John Lindley's 1839 A Sketch of the Vegetation of the Swan River Colony, based on specimens collected by James Drummond. Lindley referred to it as a "strange species" that "might be mistaken for a Colletia." It has since had a thoroughly uncomplicated taxonomic history, with no nomenclatural or taxonomic synonyms published. In 1995, however, as part of her treatment of Conospermum for the Flora of Australia series of monographs, Eleanor Bennett published a subspecies, C. acerosum subsp. hirsutum, based on material collected in 1901 by geologist and archaeologist William Dugald Campbell; thus the autonym C. acerosum subsp. acerosum was also invoked. C. acerosum subsp. acerosum has fine red hairs around the flowers and glabrous stems; subspecies hirsutum has fine hairs on the younger stems and leaf bases.

Distribution and habitat
It occurs in sandy soil, often over laterite, from the Murchison River south to Cape Leeuwin; thus it occurs mainly within the Geraldton Sandplains and Swan Coastal Plain biogeographic regions, with some populations in the Avon Wheatbelt and Jarrah Forest regions. Its Flora of Australia entry, published in 1995, states that "there is also one doubtful collection from Norseman", but this is not (or is no longer) recorded within the West Australian Herbarium's FloraBase database.

Ecology
It is not considered threatened.

References

External links

Eudicots of Western Australia
acerosum
Endemic flora of Western Australia